DeNucci is an Italian surname. Notable people with the surname include:

 A. Joseph DeNucci (1939–2017), American boxer and politician
 Dominic DeNucci (1932–2021), Italian-American wrestler

See also
 Nucci
 DiNucci

Italian-language surnames